Year 1412 (MCDXII) was a leap year starting on Friday (link will display the full calendar) on the Julian calendar.

Events 
 January–December 
 January 16 – The Medici Family are  made official bankers of the Papacy.
 January 25 – Ernest, Duke of Austria, marries Cymburgis of Masovia.
 February 28 – The University of St Andrews in Scotland is granted a charter of privilege by the local bishop.
 July 24 – Behnam Hadloyo becomes Syriac Orthodox Patriarch of Mardin.
 October 5 – Emperor Go-Komatsu abdicates, and Emperor Shoko accedes to the throne of Japan.
 October 28 – Eric of Pomerania becomes sole ruler of the Kalmar Union (Sweden, Denmark and Norway), upon the death of Queen Margaret.
 December – Battle of Chalagan: The Kara Koyunlu Turkomans defeat the Georgians under Constantine I of Georgia, and their ally Ibrahim I of Shirvan.

 Date unknown 
 The first mention is made of Wallachian knights competing in a jousting tournament, in Buda.
 John II of Castile declares the Valladolid laws, that restrict the social rights of Jews. Among many other restrictions, the laws force Jews to wear distinctive clothes, and deny them administrative positions.
 Years after its publication in the 14th century, the Ming Dynasty Chinese artillery officer Jiao Yu adds the preface to his classic book on gunpowder warfare, the Huolongjing.
 The Black Death sweeps England for a final time, in a 60-year period.

Births 
 January 6 – Joan of Arc, French soldier and saint (tradition holds that she was born on the Feast of the Epiphany, but there is no documentary evidence) (d. 1431)
 January 26 – William IV, Lord of Egmont, IJsselstein, Schoonderwoerd and Haastrecht and Stadtholder of Guelders (d. 1483)
 April 22 – Reinhard III, Count of Hanau (1451–1452) (d. 1452)
 June 5 – Ludovico III Gonzaga, Marquis of Mantua (d. 1478)
 August 22 – Frederick II, Elector of Saxony and Margrave of Meissen (1428–1464) and Landgrave of Thuringia (1440–1445) (d. 1464)
 November 17 – Zanobi Strozzi, Italian painter (d. 1468)
 December 8 – Astorre II Manfredi, Italian noble (d. 1468)

Deaths 
 March – Albrekt of Mecklenburg, king of Sweden 1364–1389 (b. 1336)
 April 2 – Ruy Gonzáles de Clavijo, Castilian traveller and writer
 May 16 – Gian Maria Visconti, Duke of Milan
 August 6 – Margherita of Durazzo, Queen consort of Charles III of Naples (b. 1347)
 September 14 – Ingegerd Knutsdotter, Swedish abbess  (b. 1356)
 October 28 – Margaret I of Denmark, queen regnant of Denmark of Norway since 1387 and of Sweden since 1389 (b. 1353)
 date unknown – Ignatius Abraham bar Garib, Syriac Orthodox Patriarch of Mardin
 date unknown – Jalal ad-Din khan, khan of the Golden Horde

References